Aitchelitch 9, a.k.a. Aitchelitch Indian Reserve No. 9, is an Indian Reserve within the City of Chilliwack, British Columbia, Canada, in the Eastern Fraser Valley of the province's Lower Mainland region.  It is located two and a half miles southwest of downtown Chilliwack.  It is the home reserve and under the governance of the Aitchelitz First Nation.

See also
List of Indian reserves in British Columbia
Atchelitz

References

Indian reserves in the Lower Mainland